The Soho Repertory Theatre, known as Soho Rep, is an American Off-Broadway theater company based in New York City which is notable for producing avant-garde plays by contemporary writers. The company, described as a "cultural pillar", is currently located in a 65-seat theatre in the TriBeCa section of lower Manhattan. The company, and the projects it has produced, have won multiple prizes and earned critical acclaim, including numerous Obie Awards, Drama Desk Awards, Drama Critics' Circle Awards, and a Pulitzer Prize. A recent highlight was winning the Drama Desk Award for Sustained Achievement for "nearly four decades of artistic distinction, innovative production, and provocative play selection."

Notable artists who have recently created work at the theater, often early in their careers, include: David Adjmi, César Alvarez, Annie Baker, Alice Birch, Christopher Chen, Jackie Sibblies Drury, debbie tucker green, Aleshea Harris, Lucas Hnath, Branden Jacobs-Jenkins, Daniel Alexander Jones, Young Jean Lee, Richard Maxwell, Nature Theater of Oklahoma and Anne Washburn.

The New York Times has described it as a "safer home for dangerous plays". Critics note the “jaw dropping premieres” and “big plays in a small room” as defining features of the theater’s programming. New Yorker theatre critic Hilton Als wrote about current director Sarah Benson:

In 2019 the company adopted a shared leadership model. The three Directors of the theater who now co-lead the company are Sarah Benson, Cynthia Flowers and Meropi Peponides.

The company has an annual budget of around $2 million and employs a full-time staff of seven. In 2020, in response to the Covid-19 pandemic, the company put eight artists on salary for the 2020-21 season through the creation of a job creation program titled Project Number One referencing Federal Project Number One.

History

The Soho Repertory Theatre company was founded in 1975 by Jerry Engelbach and Marlene Swartz. From June through September 1975, they remodeled a former textile factory in SoHo. They wanted the space to feel "light and informal" so the audience would feel comfortable. They produced their first play, Maxwell Anderson's Key Largo, on September 25. Their initial focus was on rarely seen classical plays, such as works by Aristophanes, Shakespeare, Molière, Jean Anouilh, Michel de Ghelderode, Eugene O'Neill and Samuel Beckett. By 1979, the company was sometimes producing two shows per night, allowing audiences to see both plays in succession on a Saturday night. The founding duo produced more than a hundred plays until Engelbach left in 1989.

Since its early days, the company's focus has shifted to contemporary avant-garde theatrical works. In 1981, after producing works from Shakespeare to Shaw, the company produced its first new play:  Stephen Davis Parks' The Idol Makers. Among the many new works presented were plays by Americans Len Jenkin and Mac Wellman.

After 1989, Swartz partnered with English director Julian Webber, and they worked together for the next decade until Swartz departed in 1999. The company was run by Artistic Director Daniel Aukin from 1998 to 2006, and he produced new work by artists including Adam Bock, Young Jean Lee, Richard Maxwell, Melissa James Gibson, and María Irene Fornés.

Sarah Benson was appointed as Artistic Director in 2007. Around this time, the company transitioned from the smaller Off-off-Broadway model of less than 100 seats to an Off-Broadway contract, typically reserved for theatres with a 100-499 seat capacity.

Benson and Flowers ran the theater together from 2012 until being joined by Producer Meropi Peponides in 2014. In the last decade the company has taken on ambitious projects often winning awards and critical acclaim. One of Benson's first plays was writer Sarah Kane’s Blasted which won the director an Obie Award. Benson's production of Branden Jacobs-Jenkins's An Octoroon won an Obie for Best New American Play and transferred to Theatre for a New Audience. Taibi Magar's production of Aleshea Harris' 'Is God Is' re-opened Walkerspace in 2018 following renovations and won multiple Obie awards. Benson directed Jackie Sibblies Drury's 'Fairview' which won the 2019 Pulitzer Prize for Drama and had an extended run. The company celebrates with an annual gala usually in the spring, sometimes on a rooftop.

Performance spaces
During the forty-five years of its existence, the theatre has produced in several venues in lower Manhattan, often being forced to move because of issues with rent or city building requirements, and survived from time to time with help from city authorities and supporters. Its first space in 1975 on 19 Mercer Street was in a converted hat warehouse, described by the founders as a "practical adaptation of the Shakespearean playhouse laid out in a modest modern space". In 1985, Bob Moss of Playwrights Horizons, assisted by the mayor's office and a grant from the Manhattan Borough President, helped them relocate to a 100-seat neo-classical theater attached to Bellevue Hospital. While the theatre had a separate entrance from the psychiatric hospital, sometimes backstage their actors and writers rode the same elevator with patients, recalled playwright Mac Wellman. After a year they moved to Greenwich Village, and stayed there until 1991, when they found their present-day space at 46 Walker Street in Tribeca. Dubbed Walkerspace, the present theatre is only a few blocks from the company's original venue. The company has been at this location except for a short period for building renovations, which had been paid for with a fundraising campaign as well as help from the city's building commissioner, Rick Chandler and Julie Menin.

Staff
 Marlene Swartz (1975–1995) - Co-Artistic Director
 Jerry Engelbach (1975–1989) - Co-Artistic Director
 Julian Webber (1990–1998) - Co-Artistic Director
 Daniel Aukin (1998–2006) - Artistic Director 
 Sarah Benson (2007–Present) Artistic Director
Cynthia Flowers, Executive Director (2012–present) 
Meropi Peponides, Producer (2014–present)
Since 2019, Sarah Benson, Cynthia Flowers and Meropi Peponides have served as the Directors of the theater in a shared leadership model.

Dramatic productions

External links
 SohoRep.org Official website
 SoHo Repertory Theater at Internet Off-Broadway Database
 SoHo Repertory on NYC-Arts.org

References

Off-Broadway theaters
Theatre companies in New York City
Performance art in New York City
Tribeca